During the 1994-95 English football season, AFC Bournemouth competed in the Football League Second Division. By the turn of the year, Bournemouth had won just two league games but managed to survive relegation. It is fondly remembered by supporters as the 'Great Escape'.

Final league table

Results
Bournemouth's score comes first

Legend

Football League Second Division

FA Cup

League Cup

Football League Trophy

Squad

References

1995-96
AFC Bournemouth